Velika Pristava is a small settlement south of Pivka in the Inner Carniola region of Slovenia.

References

External links
Velika Pristava on Geopedia

Populated places in the Municipality of Pivka